Norman William Gooderham (12 May 1919 – 15 December 1979) was a Canadian sailor. He competed at the 1948 Summer Olympics in the Star class and at the 1952 Summer Olympics in the 6 meter category and finished seventh-eights.

Gooderham trained at the Royal Canadian Yacht Club and later served as its president. He came from a family of prominent businessmen and sailors that included George Horace Gooderham, Albert Gooderham and William Gooderham Sr. Besides his ancestors, his sisters Audrey and Ruth, his wife JoAnne, his son Bryan and grandchildren Yolande and Billy, all competed in sailing. In 1949, during their honeymoon, Gooderham and his wife placed fourth at an international regatta in Bermuda.

References

1919 births
1979 deaths
Sportspeople from Toronto
Canadian male sailors (sport)
Olympic sailors of Canada
Sailors at the 1948 Summer Olympics – Star
Sailors at the 1952 Summer Olympics – 6 Metre